Ruben Impens is a Belgian cinematographer. He works in Flanders and is best known for his work with Felix Van Groeningen, having worked on the entirety of Van Groeningen's feature filmography. He has worked on feature films, short films, documentaries and television series.

In 2009 Ruben Impens received the Kodak award for best cinematography at the 17th Hamptons International Film Festival for The Misfortunates. His work on the film The Broken Circle Breakdown was awarded Best Cinematography at the Ensor Awards. Impens received a Magritte Award for Best Cinematography for his work on Titane.

Filmography
2004: Steve + Sky
2005: Halleluja! (television seris)
2007: With Friends Like These
2008: Moscow, Belgium
2009: The Misfortunates
2010: Adem
2010: Turquaze
2011: Code 37
2012: The Broken Circle Breakdown
2012: Offline
2012: Brasserie Romantiek
2013: Zuidflank (Television series)
2015: Café Derby
2016: Belgica
2016: Raw
2016: Black Mirror (Episode: "Men Against Fire")
2018: Beautiful Boy
2019: Dirty God
2019: The Mustang
2021: Titane
2022: The Eight Mountains

References

External links
 

Belgian cinematographers
Living people
Magritte Award winners
1971 births